Actinote is a genus of butterflies from South America of the subfamily Heliconiinae in the family Nymphalidae. (For taxonomic problems regarding this group, see Acraea.) Males interact with or without physical contact to contest the possession of mating sites. The winner in such interactions often has larger body size and is the individual that previously occupied the territory (the resident).

Species
Listed alphabetically within groups:

anacreon species group:
Actinote anacreon
Actinote calida
Actinote guichardi
Actinote issoria
Actinote kaduna
Actinote mirifica
Actinote rahira
Actinote wigginsi
Actinote zitja
mamita species group:
Actinote bonita Penz, 1996
Actinote brylla Oberthür, 1917
Actinote canutia (Hopffer, 1874)
Actinote catarina Penz, 1996
Actinote conspicua Jordan, 1913
Actinote dalmeidai Francini, 1996
Actinote discrepans d'Almeida, 1958
Actinote eberti Francini, Freitas & Penz, 2004
Actinote furtadoi Paluch, Casagrande & Mielke, 2006
Actinote genitrix (d'Almeida, 1922)
Actinote kennethi Willmott & Hall, 2009
Actinote latior Jordan, 1913
Actinote mamita (Burmeister, 1861)
Actinote melanisans Oberthür, 1917
Actinote mielkei Paluch & Casagrande, 2006
Actinote mirnae Paluch & Mielke, 2006
Actinote morio Oberthür, 1917
Actinote pratensis Francini, Freitas & Penz, 2004
Actinote rhodope d'Almeida, 1923
Actinote rufina Oberthür, 1917
Actinote zikani d'Almeida, 1951
thallia species group:
Actinote alalia (C. & R. Felder, 1860)
Actinote anteas (Doubleday, 1847) – Doubleday's actinote
Actinote carycina Jordan, 1913
Actinote guatemalena (Bates, 1864) – Guatemalan actinote
Actinote lapitha (Staudinger, 1885) – pale actinote
Actinote melampeplos Godman & Salvin, 1881 – bow-winged actinote
Actinote pallescens Jordan, 1913
Actinote parapheles Jordan, 1913
Actinote pellenea Hübner, [1821]
Actinote pyrrha (Fabricius, 1775)
Actinote quadra (Schaus, 1902)
Actinote surima (Schaus, 1902)
Actinote thalia (Linnaeus, 1758)

References

Acraeini
Nymphalidae of South America
Nymphalidae genera
Taxa named by Jacob Hübner